Vamsoddharakudu is a 2000 Telugu-language drama film directed by Sarath. It stars Nandamuri Balakrishna, Ramya Krishna, Sakshi Shivanand, Krishnam Raju with music composed by Koti. It was produced by M. S. Reddy under the Gayatri Films banner. The film was not successful at the box office.

Plot
Suryam is a physical director in a local college and lives with his mother Varalakshmi, a widow. The college in which Suryam works belongs to an Industrialist called Sudarshan Rao. Sudarshan Rao is the brother-in-law of the business magnate Rajagaru. Rajagaru has two sons, Anand and Ashok.

Sudarshan Rao has a son, Srikanth, and a daughter, Surekha. Surekha is a student in the college. Satya works as a junior PD (Physical Director) in the same college. Suryam and Surekha used to have regular fights. After a few days, they fall in love. Satya too loves Suryam.

When they visit 'Khajuraho' on a college tour, Satya implicates Suryam that he tried to rape her. After a couple of scenes, we come to know that Sudarshan Rao inducted Satya into the college to malign the image of Suryam so that his daughter Surekha hates Suryam in that process. Later on, we come to know that Satya is the daughter of a conspirator. She is asked to play the trick on Suryam in order to save her ailing father. Sudarshan Rao agrees for the marriage of Suryam and Surekha. But he wants to know why the mother of Suryam is appearing as a widow even though her husband is alive. Suryam caught unawares with this question, as he is not aware that his father is alive.

Later, Suryam discovers that Rajagaru is his father. Suryam's mother used to work as a maid in Rajagaru's house. When Rajagaru gets involved in a murder of a thief, she takes up the responsibility and gets ready to go to the jail. Moved by the unconditional sacrifice done by his maid, Rajagaru marries his maid. Sudarshan Rao, the brother-in-law of Raja, makes sure that the maid is thrown out of the house by doing manipulations. The maid comes out of the house and raises her child, Suryam. After knowing the flashback, Suryam decides to go back to his father and win his laurels and thereby set the house right.

Cast 

Nandamuri Balakrishna as Suryam
Krishnam Raju as Raja
Ramya Krishna as Satya
Sakshi Shivanand as Surekha
Charan Raj as Sudarshan Rao
Srihari as Shrikant
Brahmaji as Anand
Ravi Babu as Ashok 
Brahmanandam as Hanumantu / Anjibabu (dual role)
Babu Mohan as Dalapati
M. S. Narayana as lecturer
Chalapathi Rao as Pandu's father
Giri Babu as Satya's father
Surya as Pandu
Ramaraju as Police Inspector
Raadhika as Varalakshmi
Rama Prabha as Surekha's grandmother
Jayalalita as Ramulamma
Varsha as Suryam's sister 
Priya as Sudarshan Rao's sister
Srilakshmi as Mangamma
Kalpana Rai as warden
Y. Vijaya as Gangamma

Music 

Music was composed by Koti. Music released on Supreme Music Company.

References

External links

2000 films
2000s Telugu-language films
Indian drama films
Films directed by Sarath
Films scored by Koti
2000 drama films